Incomplete Me is the third and final studio album from metalcore band For All Those Sleeping was released by Fearless Records on June 23, 2014.

Background 
Fearless Records released a video on January 1, 2014, listing artists on their roster who planned to release new material, which the band was a part of. The new album, the album artwork, and the track listing were announced on May 6, 2014. A teaser for their first single "Crosses" was posted later that day. The official lyric video was released on May 13. The band later released the debut music video for the album, the title-track 'Incomplete Me' on June 3.

Promotion 
The band played all of Warped Tour 2014, and the album was released while they were on tour. Fearless records released an album stream on their YouTube channel the day after the initial release.

Track listing

Personnel 
Mike Champa - Lead vocals
Jerad Pierskalla - Rhythm guitar, backing unclean vocals
David Volgam-Stevens - Lead guitar
Ethan Trekell - Drums
London Snetsinger - Bass, clean vocals

Additional personnel
Alan Douches - Mastering
Jess Ess - Featured Artist
Mike Farrell - Layout
Cameron Mizel - Engineer, Producer
Felicia Simion - Photography
Sai Torres - A&R

References

2014 albums
Fearless Records albums
For All Those Sleeping albums